Eressa rhysoptila is a moth of the subfamily Arctiinae. It was described by Turner in 1922. It is found in Queensland, Australia.

References

Eressa
Moths described in 1922